Mexico competed at the 2015 Parapan American Games held in Toronto, Canada.

Medalists

Athletics

Judo

Swimming

Table tennis

References

2015 in Mexican sports
Nations at the 2015 Parapan American Games